Margarita Morselli (born 8 January 1952) is an artist who is considered a pioneer in the use of a video as a form of artistic expression in Paraguay. The work she presented was on abstraction with references to real spaces.

Biography 
Margarita Morselli was born in Asunción, Paraguay on 8 January 1952. She is an artist whose paintings were described as architecture where she used mineral tones such as shades of ocher, orange and blue. Her technique usually involves paint brushing and airbrushing. One of the recurring theme is the centralization of stairs. She often heeds or disrupts the form of the stairs by creating the illusion of perforating the two-dimensionally of the canvas. This type of technique creates an uncertain and seemingly useless space. Her more recent work addresses environmental concerns including vegetables forms and animals that, as figurative elements, create a certain tension in relation to her abstractions. She also designed costumes for theater and dance pieces. She was later invited to represent her country by participating in the 18th São Paulo Biennial (1985) which was her first one-woman exhibition in the U.S. She was also invited at the 1st Art Biennial at Canning House, London(1987) and at the 3rd Biennial of Cuenca, Ecuador(1992). She is a permanent member of the Centro Cultural de la República and president of the International Art Biennal, both in Asunción. Morselli teaches at the "Instituto para el Desarrollo Armónico de la Personalidad" (IDAP). She is a founding member of Gente de Arte which is an association of Paraguayan artists and cultural.

Education 
Morselli has a degree in music education, specifically for piano. She also has a degree from the" Universidad Nacional de Paraguay School of Law". In the Instituto para el Desarrollo Armónico de la Personalidad (IDAP), Morselli attended art classes with Olga Blinder (1939–2008). With the Brazilian professor Livío Abramo, she studied art history in Escolinha de Arte and she was able to enter upon an active professional career, winning rapid recognition as a leading figure in the new generation of Paraguayan artists. At the Instituo Superior de Bella Artes in Asunción, she studied aesthetics with Dorothée Bauerle-Willert and with Michael Krueger she learned about printmaking and printing.

Artworks

Autorretrato, 1952
Medium= Morselli started out with a self portrait, a video of twenty two minutes in color and it contains sound.

Objective= Dealt with the tension experienced by a woman endlessly climbing a flight of stairs.

Description=This work could be interpreted into two different ways which were as a commentary on the seemly endless dictatorship in Paraguay of Alfredo Stroessner (1954–89); second, as an interrogation of female subjectivity moving upward as it searches for a way out or a response of a vague questions.

Her work was described as well oriented that constituted a significant presence among painters of the younger generation. It was also seen as very mysterious, which led to her paintings having a lot of strange meanings attached to them.

ESCALERA VI, 1985 
Medium = Mixed media on canvas.

Description = A set of stairs from which water trickles.

Others 
Morselli has other paintings such as the ones listed below, but very few if any descriptions of them.

 DECONSTRUCCIÓN, 1992
 DE LA SERIE SOMOS, 1997
 EL PESCADOR ESCONDIDO PRIMAVERA AZUL, 1992
 SIN TÍTULO, 1999
 PAISAJE ENCENDIDO

Exhibitions

Solo exhibitions 
Morselli was able to start her first solo show in 1982, at the Galería Arte-Sanos, Asunción.

 1982 Pinturas, Galería Arte-Sanos, Asunción, Paraguay
 1987 Margarita Morselli of Paraguay: Paintings, Museum of Modern Art of Latin America, Washington DC
 1991 Derrumbe, Galería Arte-Sanos, Asunción, Paraguay
 1991 Mon repos, Casa Hassler, San Bernardino, Paraguay
 2004 Punto de mira, Casa Hassler, San Bernardino, Paraguay
 2005 - "PUNTO DE MIRA", Extensión cultural de la UNAM, Canadá
 2006 - Muestra individual en la embajada paraguaya en París, Francia
 2009 - "PUNTO DE MIRA", Muestra Etnia ELA. Bruselas, Bélgica.

Group exhibitions 
 Casa Taller (1981)
 Centro Cultural Paraguayo Americano CCPA (1982)
 Cámara Junior "Premio Benson and Hedges"
 Club Náutico San Bernardino (1983)
 Yacht y Golf Club "Pinturas y Esculturas" (1983)
 Artesanos "Arte sobre Arte"
 Artesanos "Post Figuración" (1983)
 Hotel Casino "San Bernardino" (1984)
 Arte-Sanos "Pequeño Formato" (1984)
 Artesanos Arte Experimental Audiovisual (1984)
 Gran Unión: "Muestra en Apoyo a Teletón (1984)
 Club Centenario: "Artistas Parag. en C.C. (1984)
 Washington y varios países de E.E. Exp. Itinerantes (1985)
 Magister "Plástica Paraguaya Actual" (1985)
 Centro Cultural Juan de Salazar "Premio Homenaje a los Def. del Chaco" (1985)
 18º Bienal de São Paulo "Brasil" (1985)
 Artesanos "Artistas Parag. en la 18º. Bienal. de São Paulo (1986)
 Artesanos "20 x 20"(1986)
 Galería Magister "Naturaleza Muerta" (1986)
 Galería "Las Margaritas" Areguá 1º Bienal de Arte de Areguá (1987)
 Artesanos "Interiores" (1987)
 Canning House - London The 1º.st Art. Biennial (1987)
 San Bernardino Club Náutico y Banco Unión (1988)
 Artesanos "El Paisaje" (1988)
 Magister "III Aniversario" (1988)
 Artesanos "Naturarte" Fundación Vida Silvestre Paraguaya (1988)
 Artesanos "20 x 20" (1988)
 Galería Miró "Realidad y Fantasía" (1988)
 Artesanos "Los otros Lugares" (1988)
 San Bernardino. Viejo Galpón. Banco Unión. Club Náutico. Galería Miró (1989)
 Artesanos "Acto de Libertad" (1989)
 Galería "Nuevo Espacio" Inaugural (1989)
 Magister "5 Pintoras" (1989)
 Centro Cultural Paraguayo Alemán Derechos – Mujer (1989)
 Artesanos "15 Años de Artesanos" (1989)
 Bosque de los Artistas Gran Premio XX Aniversario (1989)
 San Bernardino "Casa Hassler", Banco Unión, Club Náutico, Municipalidad (1990)
 Museo Paraguayo de Arte Contemporáneo "Premio Martel" (1990)
 Banco Central del Paraguay. Arte Paraguayo en XXº. Asamblea de la O.E.A. (1990)
 Embajada de Israel (1990)
 Galería Artesanos "Contrapunto" con Olga Blinder (1991)
 España Universidad de Henares. Homenaje a Augusto Roa Bastos (1990)
 Artesanos "La Escena" Ausp. Embajada de España (1990)
 México - Guadalajara Homenaje a Augusto Roa Bastos (1991)
 San Bernardino - Club Náutico (1991)
 Luxemburgo "Semana Cultural Latinoamericana" (1991)
 Japón - Nagoya Galería de Arte Latinoamericano (1991)
 San Bernardino. Banco Unión "Serigrafías" (1991)
 Embajada Argentina "Arte Paraguayo" (1991)
 Arte Espacio "Expo 91" (1991)
 Centoira Argentina - Bs. As. "5 Artistas Paraguayos" (1991)
 III Bienal Internacional de Pintura - Cuenca Ecuador (1991)
 Artesanos "40 x 40" (Diciembre 1991)
 Artesanos "La Negación de la Figura" (Agosto 1992)

Collections 
Her work is in the collections of the Art Museum of the Americas and National Museum of Women in the Arts, both in Washington, DC; Museo de Arte Contemporáneo, Concepción, Paraguay; and Museo del Barro, Asunción.

 Embajada Paraguaya en E.E.U.U.
 Embajada Paraguaya en Francia.
 Embajada Paraguaya en Brasil.
 En colecciones privadas de diferentes países.

Honors and awards 
In 1990 she was awarded grand prize at the twentieth anniversary of the Bosque de los Artistas, an art space created by the sculptor Hermann Guggiari(1924-2012). She also received the juror's prize at the Martel Biennal in Asunción.

 Premio "Homenaje a los Defensores del Chaco" (1985)

Publications 
 "Las aptitudes deben aprovecharse" Diario Hoy (1980)
 "Arte y Comunicación" Revista Nº 4 Club Centenario (1991)
 "Re Creación" Diario Ultima Hora (1983)
"Todo está dicho en la Expo" Diario Ultima Hora. (1992)
El Inalcanzable : Agustín Barrios Mangoré

Bibliography 
 Díaz de Espada de Ramírez Boettener, Sara. Mujeres paraguayas contemporáneas. Asunción, Paraguay: Talleres Gráficos Makrographic, 1989.
 Escobar, Ticio. Los argumentos: Exposicion de artes visibles. Asunción, Paraguay Centro Cultural de España, 2002.
 Una interpretación de las Artes Visuales en el Paraguay. Asunción, Paraguay Centro Cultural Paraguayo Americano, 1984.
 Forjadores del Paraguay, Diccionario Biográfico. Buenos Aires: Distribuidora Quevedo de Ediciones, 2000.
 Margarita Morselli of Paraguay: Paintings. Washington, DC: Museum of Modern Art of Latin America,1987.

References

External links 
 https://www.portalguarani.com/191_margarita_morselli.html
 http://www.senado.gov.py/images/archivos/CV-DIRECCION-GENERAL/CV_MM.pdf
 http://www.abc.com.py/tag/margarita-morselli-68772.html

1952 births
Living people
Paraguayan women painters
Paraguayan painters
Video artists